Goldfield's crevice-skink (Egernia formosa) is a species of large skink, a lizard in the family Scincidae. The species is native to western Australia.

References

Skinks of Australia
Egernia
Reptiles described in 1914